The following are the national records in speed skating in Sweden maintained by the Svenska Skridskoförbundet.

Men

Women

References

External links
Svenska Skridskoförbundet website

Sweden
Records
Speed skating
Sweden
Speed skating